Be With is a compilation album by Koushik, a Canadian hip hop musician. Serving as Koushik's first major release, the album compiles tracks from three of Koushik's old EPs: Battle Times, Be With and One In A Day. The Be With EP was released as a 12" vinyl.  The album is intended to be reminiscent of 1960s psych-pop. Koushik also provides singing vocals to the tracks.

Track listing
All tracks composed by Koushik Ghosh
 "Be With" – 4:12
 Produced by Koushik
 Contains a sample from "Back to the Country" by Hurricane Smith
 "Homage" – 0:59
 Produced by Koushik
 "Pretty Soon" – 1:58
 Produced by Koushik
 "Take It Back (Interlude)" – 0:30
 Produced by Koushik
 "Winter Sun" – 0:22
 Produced by Koushik
 "One in a Day" – 3:33
 Produced by Koushik
 "Back to the End" – 1:28
 Produced by Koushik
 "Too Many Ways" – 2:12
 Produced by Koushik
 "Ride Out" – 0:50
 Produced by Koushik
 "Ride It Out" – 1:47
 Produced by Koushik
 "Battle Rhymes for Battles Times" – 2:42
 Produced by Koushik
 "Younger Than Today, Pt. 1" – 1:39
 Produced by Koushik
 "Ew" – 2:28
 Produced by Koushik
 "Only Dreaming" – 1:22
 Produced by Koushik
 "I'd Like to Get to Know You" – 1:43
 Produced by Koushik

Album notes
 Tracks 1 to 4 appear on the Be With EP.
 Tracks 5 to 10 appear on the One In A Day EP.
 Tracks 11 to 14 appear on the Battle Times EP.

Credits
 Executive producer: Peanut Butter Wolf
 Mastering: Dave Cooley

External links 
 Koushik on Stones Throw
 Stones Throw Records official site

Koushik albums
2005 compilation albums
Stones Throw Records compilation albums